Anna Memija (born 18 February 2004) is an American-born Albanian footballer who plays as a forward for the Albania national team.

Raised in Saddle Brook, New Jersey, Memija played prep soccer at Saddle Brook High/Middle School.

International career
Memija made her debut for the Albania national team on 27 November 2020, as a substitute for Megi Doci against Cyprus.

See also
List of Albania women's international footballers

References

2004 births
Living people
Albanian women's footballers
Women's association football forwards
Albania women's international footballers
People from Saddle Brook, New Jersey
Sportspeople from Bergen County, New Jersey
Soccer players from New Jersey
American women's soccer players
American people of Albanian descent
Sportspeople of Albanian descent
21st-century American women